A stuffing box or gland package is an assembly which is used to house a gland seal.  It is used to prevent leakage of fluid, such as water or steam, between sliding or turning parts of machine elements.

Components
A stuffing box of a sailing boat will have a stern tube that is slightly bigger than the prop shaft. It will also have packing nut threads or a gland nut. The packing is inside the gland nut and creates the seal. The shaft is wrapped by the packing and put in the gland nut. Through tightening it onto the stern tube, the packing is compressed, creating a seal against the shaft. Creating a proper plunger alignment is critical for correct flow and a long wear life. Stuffing box components are of stainless steel, brass or other application-specific materials. Compression packing is rigorously tested to ensure effective sealing in valves, pumps, agitators, and other rotary equipment.

Gland
A gland is a general type of stuffing box, used to seal a rotating or reciprocating  shaft against a fluid.  The most common example is in the head of a tap (faucet) where the gland is usually packed with string which has been soaked in tallow or similar grease.  The gland nut allows the packing material to be compressed to form a watertight seal and prevent water leaking up the shaft when the tap is turned on. The gland at the rotating shaft of a centrifugal pump may be packed in a similar way and graphite grease used to accommodate continuous operation. The linear seal around the piston rod of a double acting steam piston is also known as a gland, particularly in marine applications. Likewise the shaft of a handpump or wind pump is sealed with a gland where the shaft exits the borehole.

Other types of sealed connections without moving parts are also sometimes called glands; for example, a cable gland or fitting that connects a flexible electrical conduit to an enclosure, machine or bulkhead facilitates assembly and prevents liquid or gas ingress.

Applications

Boats

On a boat having an inboard motor that turns a shaft attached to an external propeller, the shaft passes through a stuffing box, also called a "packing box" or "stern gland" in this application. The stuffing box prevents water from entering the boat's hull. In many small fiberglass boats, for example, the stuffing box is mounted inboard near the point the shaft exits the hull. The "box" is a cylindrical assembly, typically of bronze, comprising a sleeve threaded on one end to accept adjusting and locking nuts. A special purpose heavy-duty rubber hose attaches the stuffing box to a stern tube, also called a shaft log, that projects inward from the hull. Marine-duty hose clamps secure the hose to the stern tube and the aft portion of the stuffing box sleeve. A sound stuffing box installation is critical to safety because failure can admit a catastrophic volume of water into the boat.

In a common type of stuffing box, rings of braided fiber, known as shaft packing or gland packing, form a seal between the shaft and the stuffing box. A traditional variety of shaft packing comprises a square cross-section rope made of flax or hemp impregnated with wax and lubricants. A turn of the adjusting nut compresses the shaft packing. Ideally, the compression is just enough to make the seal both watertight when the shaft is stationary and drip slightly when the shaft is turning. The drip rate must be at once sufficient to lubricate and cool the shaft and packing, but not so much as could sink an unattended boat.

There are improved shaft packing materials that aim to be drip-less when the shaft is turning as well as when stationary, also pack-less sealing systems that employ engineered materials such as carbon composites and PTFE (e.g. Teflon).

Steam engines

In a steam engine, where the piston rod reciprocates through the cylinder cover, a stuffing box provided in the cylinder cover prevents the leakage of steam from the cylinder.

See also
 Axlebox
 Bilge
 Compression seal fitting
 Journal bearing
 Journal box
 Labyrinth seal

References

Further reading
Calder, Nigel (2005). Boatowner's mechanical and electrical manual. Camden, Maine: International Marine/McGraw-Hill.

External links
 Servicing Your Stuffing Box, by Don Casey
 Step-by-Step Instructions For Servicing Your Stuffing Box, by Capt. Vincent Daniello, August 16, 2012

Pistons
Marine propulsion
Seals (mechanical)
Steam engines
Piston engines